Deborah Baker Jr. (born August 1, 1982) is an American actress raised in Boston. She is known for her role as Esther on the CBS TV series The Great Indoors and for her role as Denise Miller on IFC's Stan Against Evil. She is a performer at Upright Citizens Brigade.

Baker was nominated for Best Supporting Actress at the Hoboken International Film Fest in 2013.

In 2019, Baker appeared in a series of RumChata liqueur commercials playing "The RumChata Fairy".

Filmography

Television
The Great Indoors as Esther (2016–17)
Stan Against Evil as Denise Miller (2016–18)
The Neighborhood as Brittany (2020–21)

References

External links

1982 births
Living people
American television actresses
American stage actresses
21st-century American women